Phaseolus dumosus, the year bean or year-long bean, is an annual to perennial herbaceous vine in the family Fabaceae (legumes), native to a narrow region in the highlands of Guatemala. It is one of the five Phaseolus domesticates and is similarly used for its beans. It was recently found to be a hybrid between two other cultivated species of Central America, Phaseolus coccineus and P. vulgaris and displays intermediate characteristics. Taxonomically, it was previously categorized as Phaseolus polyanthus and P. coccineus ssp. darwinianus.

This species grows in humid forests and may reach 10 meters in length. It is visited by carpenter bees.

References 

dumosus